The Illinois Fighting Illini men's golf team represents the University of Illinois at Urbana–Champaign in the sport of golf. The Fighting Illini compete in Division I of the National Collegiate Athletic Association (NCAA) and the Big Ten Conference (Big Ten). They play their home matches on the Stone Creek Golf Club five miles from the university's campus, and are currently led by head coach Mike Small. The Fighting Illini men's golf program has won 19 Big Ten championships and in 2013 finished as national runner-up at the NCAA Division I Men's Golf Championships, which was the highest finish in the program's history. 2017 was the fifth consecutive year, and sixth time in the last seven seasons, that the Fighting Illini advanced to the match play portion of the NCAA Men's Golf Championships. The Fighting Illini have advanced to the Final Four of the NCAA Men's Golf Championship in three consecutive seasons, and in four of the last five years.

The Fighting Illini have won 12 of the last 13 Big Ten Golf Championships. Illinois golfers have won the Big Ten Individual Conference Title for nine consecutive seasons (2011−2019).

Individual honors

National champions 
 Scott Langley − 2010
 Thomas Pieters − 2012

All-Americans 

 Joe Burden – 1972 (HM)
 Marty Schiene – 1979 (HM)
 Mike Chadwick – 1983 (HM)
 Steve Stricker – 1987 (HM), 1988 (1st), 1989 (1st)
 D. A. Points – 1999 (3rd)
 James Lepp – 2002 (HM), 2003 (2nd)
 Patrick Nagle – 2003 (3rd)
 Scott Langley – 2009 (2nd), 2010 (1st), 2011 (HM)
 Chris DeForest – 2011 (HM)
 Luke Guthrie – 2011 (1st), 2012 (2nd)
 Thomas Pieters – 2012 (1st), 2013 (HM)
 Charlie Danielson – 2013 (HM), 2014 (HM), 2015 (2nd), 2016 (1st)
 Thomas Detry – 2014 (HM), 2015 (2nd), 2016 (2nd)
 Brian Campbell – 2014 (2nd), 2015 (2nd)
 Dylan Meyer – 2016 (HM), 2017 (1st), 2018 (2nd)
 Nick Hardy – 2017 (2nd), 2018 (1st)

Note: 1st = first team, 2nd = second team, 3rd = third team, HM = honorable mention

Other
Since 1923, fifteen Fighting Illini golfers have won nineteen Big Ten individual titles. Thirty-two Fighting Illini golfers have earned 61 All-Big Ten honors.

Coaching staff
Mike Small is the head coach of the Illinois Fighting Illini men's golf team, and 2016–17 will be his seventeenth season with the Fighting Illini. He is a nine-time Big Ten Conference Coach of the Year, and is also an eight-time NCAA Regional Coach of the Year as named by the Golf Coaches Association of America. As a professional, Small is a record-tying three time PGA Professional National Champion and has won the Illinois PGA Championship a record-setting twelve times. Former Fighting Illini men's golfer Zach Barlow was hired at the start of the 2014–15 season as the new assistant coach. Barlow was a member of the Fighting Illini's 2009 and 2010 Big Ten Championship teams and spent a year playing professionally on both the NGA Pro Golf Tour and the eGolf Professional Tour.

Current roster

Notable alumni
 Luke Guthrie
 Nick Hardy
 Scott Langley
 Dylan Meyer
 Thomas Pieters
 D. A. Points
 Steve Stricker

Facilities

Demirjian Indoor Golf Practice Facility
Opened in 2007, the university's $5.2 million, 14,150-square-foot Demirjian Indoor Golf Practice Facility features a 6,300-square-foot putting, chipping, and pitching area that includes sand bunkers and different strains of artificial grass, six heated hitting bays which open onto the range, team locker rooms, coaches offices and a team lounge. Prior to the completion of the Demirjian Indoor Golf Practice Facility, indoor practice's were typically held in the basement of Huff Hall on an old handball court. In 2008, the facility received an Honor Award from the American Institute of Architects Illinois Chapter in the Architecture Design Award Category.

Lauritsen/Wohlers Outdoor Golf Practice Facility
Construction on the $2 million, 24 acre facility began during the summer of 2014, with a completion date in fall of 2014. Taking inspiration from the Augusta National Golf Club practice facility, the Lauritsen/Wohlers Outdoor Golf Practice Facility was designed by Fighting Illini head coach Mike Small, former Fighting Illini and PGA Tour professional Steve Stricker, and golf course architect Jeff Brauer. Training center with target fairways, target greens, fairway and greenside bunkers, putting greens, chipping greens and a wedge area The outdoor facility is located directly adjacent to the Demirjian Indoor Practice Building.

Atkins Golf Club
The university course was originally designed by noted golf course architect Dick Nugent and his son Tim in 1999. The course is a 7,118-yard par 72, and the facilities include a practice and teaching center for the surrounding community. The Atkins Golf Club has hosted several Big Ten Conference men's and women's golf championships. Originally named Stone Creek Golf Club, the course was gifted to the University of Illinois Division of Intercollegiate Athletics by The Atkins Group and renamed to the Atkins Golf Club on June 30, 2020.

References

External links
 Official site